English National Ballet is a classical ballet company founded by Dame Alicia Markova and Sir Anton Dolin as London Festival Ballet and based in London, England. Along with The Royal Ballet, Birmingham Royal Ballet, Northern Ballet and Scottish Ballet, it is one of the five major ballet companies in Great Britain.  English National Ballet is one of the foremost touring companies in Europe, performing in theatres throughout the UK as well as conducting international tours and performing at special events. The Company employs approximately 67 dancers and a symphony orchestra, (English National Ballet Philharmonic). In 1984 Peter Schaufuss became director and changed the name to English National Ballet and founded the school English National Ballet School, which is independent from the ballet company but joining the company premises in the new building. The Company regularly performs seasons at the London Coliseum and has been noted for specially staged performances at the Royal Albert Hall. In 2014 English National Ballet became an Associate Company of Sadler's Wells.

History

English National Ballet was founded in 1950 as Gala Performances of Ballet by the British dance couple, Alicia Markova and Anton Dolin. The Company later adopted the name Festival Ballet, then London Festival Ballet, and in June 1989, English National Ballet.

Markova and Dolin were leading stars of the Ballets Russes, one of the most influential ballet companies of the 20th century. After the death of its director Serge Diaghilev in 1929, the Company was disbanded and in 1931, one of its dancers, Ninette de Valois, founded the Vic-Wells Ballet Company in London, with Markova and Dolin as Principal dancers, Markova becoming Prima Ballerina in 1933. Markova and Dolin left the Vic-Wells Ballet in 1935 to tour as the Markova-Dolin Company and following the success of their performances, they decided to form their own company with the sole purpose being to tour both nationally and internationally, taking ballet to audiences that had not had the opportunity to see the art form.

London Festival Ballet was founded in 1950 with the financial backing of the Polish impresario Julian Braunsweg. The name was inspired by the then imminent Festival of Britain, however the Company would later be renamed to today's English National Ballet. Dolin was the Company's first Artistic Director and established the Company as a touring group both nationally in the UK and Internationally, touring abroad for the first time in 1951. Dolin also introduced a number of educational programs in the early years, designed to make ballet accessible to new audiences. Dolin remained as Artistic Director until 1962, succeeded by John Gilpin, who was also principal dancer with the Company from 1950 to 1960 and 1962 to 1971. The Company grew in size and status, undertaking extensive national and international tours, presenting a new generation of dancers—all while repeatedly facing bankruptcy. Braunsweg left in 1965 and Donald Albery took over until 1968, stabilising the budget with safer programming. Former Royal Ballet dancer Beryl Grey directed the Company (now named London Festival Ballet) from 1968 to 1979, raising technical standards, touring widely and inviting prominent guest stars and choreographers including Leonide Massine and Rudolf Nureyev, who picked ballerina Eva Evdokimova to be his first Princess Aurora in his production of The Sleeping Beauty in 1975. In 1979 John Field became director of the company until 1984.

In 1984 Peter Schaufuss who had won both the Olivier and Evening Standard Awards as a dancer and for his production of La Sylphide with the Company, became its director and revitalised the company. During his directorship he succeeded in changing the name to English National Ballet, founding the school, inviting princess Diana as patron and presenting many important choreographers ballets with the company for the first time such as Sir Frederick Ashton, Sir Kenneth MacMillan, Christopher Bruce, Michael Clarke, John Neumeier, George Balanchine, Alvin Ailey, Roland Petit, Maurice Bejart, and John Cranko. This period is considered by many the golden age where the company reached a new and higher level.

In 1990 Ivan Nagy became director (until 1993), Derek Deane (until 2001) and Matz Skoog (until 2006) and directed the Company before Wayne Eagling, former head of Dutch National Ballet who took over in 2006. In April 2012, following the February sudden announcement of resignation by Eagling, principal dancer for The Royal Ballet Tamara Rojo was announced to become his successor at the end of the 2012 season, in August of that year.

In November 2019, Prince Andrew, who had served as Patron of the English National Ballet since 2001, resigned amid the Jeffrey Epstein scandal fallout.

In January 2022, Rojo announced that she will leave the company at the end of the year to takeover the San Francisco Ballet. In August of that year, it was announced that Aaron S. Watkin will become the artistic director beginning in August 2023.

People
Artistic Directors:
Sir Anton Dolin, 1950–1962
John Gilpin, 1962–1968
Dame Beryl Grey, 1968–1979
John Field, 1979–1984
Peter Schaufuss, 1984–1990
Ivan Nagy, 1990–1993
Derek Deane, 1993–2001
Matz Skoog, 2001–2006
Wayne Eagling, 2006–2012
Tamara Rojo, 2012–2022

Dancers
The Company's dancers are listed on the official website with photographs and linked biographies.

Lead principals

Principals

Character artists
 Michael Coleman

First soloists

Aitor Arrieta
Emma Hawes
Katja Khaniukova
Alison McWhinney
Adela Ramirez
Fabian Reimair
Ken Saruhashi
Junor Souza
James Streeter

Soloists

Rina Kanehara
Haruhi Otani
Skyler Martin
Daniel McCormick

Junior soloists

Precious Adams
Julia Conway
Tiffany Hedman
Anjuli Hudson
Senri Kou
Daniel Kraus
Erik Woolhouse

First Artists 

Jung ah Choi
Isabelle Brouwers
Henry Dowden
Sarah Kundi
Van Le Ngoc
Stina Quagebeur
Francesca Velicu

Artists of the Company

Matthew Astley
Clare Barrett
William Beagley
Alice Bellini
Rebecca Blenkinsop
Georgia Bould
Ivana Bueno
Emilia Cadorin 
Fernando Carratala Coloma
Noam Durand
Eireen Evrard
Breanna Ford
Carolyne Galvao
Giorgio Garrett
Amber Hunt
Chloe Keneally
Pedro Lapetra
Adriana Lizardi
Miguel Angel Maidana
Josue Moreno
Rentaro Nakaaki
Maeve Nolan
Victor Prigent
William Simmons
Lucinda Strachan
Emily Suzuki
Anna-Babette Winkler
Angela Wood
William Yamada
Rhys Antoni Yeomans

Notable Productions

Rudolf Nureyev’s award-winning production of Romeo & Juliet was especially created for the English National Ballet (then the London Festival Ballet) in 1977 to celebrate the Queen’s Silver Jubilee.
ENB gave the world premieres of Christopher Bruce´s Land, The World Again, Swansong and Symphony in Three Movements.

English National Ballet commissioned Akram Khan, who had never worked with any ballet companies before, to create a one-act ballet about World War I. His ballet, titled Dust, premiered in 2014 and received rave reviews. It was brought to Glastonbury Festival later that year, making it English National Ballet's debut at Glastonbury.

In 2016, English National Ballet presented She Said, an all-female choreographer mixed bill, which includes Annabelle Lopez Ochoa's Broken Wings, which was based on Frida Kahlo's life.

References

External links
 
Strictly Gershwin at the Royal Albert Hall
YouTube: English Ballet Company: Swan Lake

 
1950 establishments in England
Dance companies in the United Kingdom
Ballet in London
Cultural organisations based in London
National Dance Award winners
Performing groups established in 1950